Culumbodina is an extinct conodont genus.

References

External links 

 
 Culumbodina at fossilworks.org (retrieved 3 May 2016)

Conodont genera